Hypocrisias fuscipennis is a moth of the subfamily Arctiinae. It was described by Hermann Burmeister in 1878. It is found in Argentina and Brazil.

References

 

Phaegopterina
Moths described in 1878